Central African Republic–People's Republic of China relations refer to the bilateral relations of the Central African Republic and the People's Republic of China. Diplomatic relations between the People's Republic of China and the Central African Republic were established on September 29, 1964, when the CAR's government severed diplomatic relations with the Republic of China (Taiwan). China's ambassador to the Central African Republic is Ma Fulin as of 2017.

History
Following establishment of relations in 1964, when Jean-Bédel Bokassa came to power in 1966, he switched the nation's recognition back to Taiwan, severing diplomatic ties with the government in  Beijing, which lasted until although Bokassa's reversal and visited Beijing in 1976. The Central African Republic switched its recognition back to Taipei in 1991 under President André-Dieudonné Kolingba. Kolingba's successor, Ange-Félix Patassé, would switch the CAR's recognition back to the People's Republic of China in 1998, which remained as of 2017. Since 1998, China has delivered much foreign aid to the CAR, including doctors and civil engineers. Trade between China and the CAR has increased in the 2000s (decade), and CAR President François Bozizé Yangouvonda called for more Chinese investment in the country in 2009.

The Chinese embassy in Bangui temporarily suspended its operations in 2013 after the fall of President Bozizé and the subsequent civil war, but as of 2016 it was reopened.

Central African Republic was one of 53 countries, that in June 2020, backed the Hong Kong national security law at the United Nations.

Economic development
Since the first Forum on China Africa Cooperation in 2000, the Chinese government has delivered $152 million in development assistance to the Central Africa Republic. Several major Chinese aid projects in the Central African Republic include:
A $67.4 million loan from the Exim Bank of China to install fix and mobile networks in the country.
 Construction of a 20,000-seat stadium in Bangui financed by the Chinese government.
The cancellation of $11.4 million in debt owed to China.

Military aid
Chinese instructors have trained members of the Central African Republic's internal security forces, such as police and presidential guard, in 2018.

See also
Foreign relations of the Central African Republic
Foreign relations of China

References

 
China
Africa–China relations
Bilateral relations of China